Cymothoe excelsa, the scalloped red glider, is a butterfly in the family Nymphalidae. It is found in Nigeria, Cameroon, the Republic of the Congo, the Central African Republic, the Democratic Republic of the Congo and Angola.

The larvae feed on Rinorea species.

Subspecies
Cymothoe excelsa excelsa (Nigeria: Cross River loop, Cameroon, Congo, Central African Republic) 
Cymothoe excelsa deltoides Overlaet, 1944 (Democratic Republic of the Congo: Lualaba, Angola: southern Cabinda)
Cymothoe excelsa regisleopoldi Overlaet, 1944 (Democratic Republic of the Congo: Ubangi, Mongala, Uele, Ituri, north Kivu, Tshopo, Equateur)

References

Butterflies described in 1912
Cymothoe (butterfly)